BACC may stand for:
 Bachelor of Accountancy (B.Acc.), an academic degree
 Baccalauréat (usual abbreviated bac), French high school diploma
 Bangkok Art and Culture Centre, a contemporary arts museum in Bangkok, Thailand
 Bay Area Climate Collaborative, a non-profit organization in the San Francisco Bay Area
 Billiards Association and Control Council, a now defunct governing body of professional snooker and English billiards
 Blocco Automatico a Correnti Codificate, an Italian train protection system
 Broadcast Advertising Clearance Centre, a former British non-government organization responsible for pre-approving television commercials